Zenith Sangma is the current member of Meghalaya Legislative Assembly (MLA) from Rangsakona constituency. 
He won the election in 2003, 2013, and 2018.

Sangma was the sports minister of the Meghalaya assembly for the period from 2013 to 2018.

Sangma is the brother of former Chief Minister of Meghalaya Mukul Sangma.

References 

Living people
1971 births
Meghalaya MLAs 2003–2008
Meghalaya MLAs 2013–2018
Meghalaya MLAs 2018–2023
People from South West Garo Hills district
Trinamool Congress politicians from Meghalaya
Former members of Indian National Congress